Luigi (Gino) Raffin (born 1 June 1936 in Gonars) is a retired Italian professional football player and coach.

External links

1936 births
Living people
Italian footballers
Serie A players
Juventus F.C. players
Calcio Lecco 1912 players
U.S. Livorno 1915 players
Venezia F.C. players
Brescia Calcio players
Palermo F.C. players
F.C. Pro Vercelli 1892 players
Italian football managers
A.S.D. Sorrento managers

Association football forwards
A.S.D. La Biellese players